Lac Seul First Nation is an Ojibwe First Nation band government located on the southeastern shores of Lac Seul,  northeast of the city of Dryden, Ontario. Though Lac Seul First Nation is a treaty signatory to Treaty 3, the First Nation is a member of the Independent First Nations Alliance, a regional tribal council and a member of the Nishnawbe Aski Nation.

The registered population of Lac Seul was 2,837 persons in April 2008, of which the on-reserve population was 774. The First Nation have the  Lac Seul 28 Indian reserve, known as Obishikokaang in the Anishinaabe language, containing three settlements. Frenchmen's Head and Kejick Bay each have a population of about 400 each, while Whitefish Bay has a population of about 100.

In 1929 Ontario Hydro constructed a dam at Ear Falls to control the level of the lake to produce hydroelectricity. The flooding from turning the lake into a reservoir caused the area known previously as Kejick Bay to become an island, permanently separating it from the mainland and splitting the community into two parts. The island portion retained the name Kejick Bay and the portion of the community on the mainland became Whitefish Bay.

The Indian reserve is bordered on all sides by territory of the Unorganized Kenora District, except at its southeast, which borders the town of Sioux Lookout.

Name
The French name for the lake and the reserve, Lac Seul, may be a mistranslation of Obishikokaang as Obezhigokaang: "Sole Abundance". The meaning of Obishikokaang is not known but the typical translation of Obishikokaang provided is "Narrows [Abundant] with White Pine" or "White Pine Narrows", which in common Ojibwe should be something closer to Obaazhingwaakokaang.

Governance
The Lac Seul First Nation is governed by

Chief

Clifford Bull

Frenchman’s Head Council

Samantha Kejick

Elvis Trout

Raymond Angeconeb

Nora Vincent

Kejick Bay Council

Darrin Trout

Stan Littledeer

Gerald Kejick

Whitefish Bay Council

Wade Bull

Settlements
 Canoe River, Ontario—a historical settlement, which its residents were relocated to Kejick Bay
 Frenchmen's Head, Ontario (Wemitigoozhiiwitigwaaning)
 Kejick Bay, Ontario
 Whitefish Bay, Ontario
 Hudson, Kenora District—a nearby town with many residents registered with Lac Seul First Nation

Notable members 
 Rebecca Belmore, performance and installation artist
 Ahmoo Angeconeb (1955–2017), artist

External links
 AANDC profile
 profile from Independent First Nations Alliance
 Map of Lac Seul 28 at Statcan

References

First Nations governments in Ontario
Communities in Kenora District
Nishnawbe Aski Nation
Anishinaabe reserves in Ontario